Improvement plan may refer to:

Performance improvement planning
Service Improvement Plan, a program to provide a basic telephone service to most Canadians
Capital improvement plan
Process improvement plan in Six Sigma